Mafia   is a 1996 Indian-Hindi-language action film directed by Aziz Sejawal and starring Dharmendra, Aditya Pancholi, Somy Ali, Gulshan Grover, Mohan Joshi and Raza Murad. The film was praised for its action sequences and cast performances, where it was declared a Hit at the box office.

Plot
Gawda is an influential crime boss involved in illegal supply of arms and drug smuggling activities in Mumbai, and also uses his influence to thwart communal riots and release convict prisoners. Having learnt about the rules of the crime syndicate,  Gawda's ex-henchman Moosa express his animosity to Gawda and decide to start his own syndicate business. However, Gawda kills Moosa and his daughter, but their deaths become the headlines in the newspaper. 

The commissioner assigns Inspector Bhagat Singh to investigate the case, but is later killed by Gawda with DCP Pawar's help. After learning his death, Bhagat's brothers Ajit, an army soldier and Jai, an unemployed man decide to take vengeance on Gawda and the police corruption. How does the brothers complete their vengeance forms the rest of the plot.

Background
This film is heavily influenced by 1990s Hollywood action films with a common theme of police corruption and a mafia dominating the government, but using a comedic style.  The music for the film is by the famous duo Anand–Milind, with lyrics written by Sameer. The film features songs such as "Dil Mera Deewana Dhahdke", "Duniya Nazaray", "Yeh Dil Yeh Paagal Dil" and "Is Ladki Ne Mera". The film premiered on 24 May 1996 and was released by Prathima Films. It has since been released on DVD by Eros Entertainment.

Cast

Dharmendra as Fauji Ajit Singh 
Aditya Pancholi as Inspector Bhagat Singh
Jay Mehta as Jai Singh
Somy Ali as Kiran Pawar
Raza Murad as Police Commissioner Pawar
Mohan Joshi as DCP Bapat
Gulshan Grover	as Parab Anna
Charan Raj	as Gawda
Pramod Mouthu as Minister Praja Swami
Ishrat Ali as Moosa
Harish Patel as Kalyanji Bhai Matke
Subbiraj as Acharya
Babu Antony as Chhote 
Ali Asgar as Jai's Friend 
Arun Bakshi as John T. Dalla
Ramesh Goyal as Praja Swami's driver
Ahmed Khan as military Official
Mehmood Junior as Hariya
Ghanashyam Nayak as Constable 
Robert as Gawda gang member
Siddhant as Gawda gang member

Soundtrack
The soundtrack album of the movie, composed by Anand–Milind has a number of striking songs formulated by Sameer and performed by some big-time playback singers of the period, notably Kumar Sanu, Alka Yagnik and a few others. The movie has pleasant tracks; "Dil Mera Deewana Dhadke", being a fine sensual number with analogous beats of percussion instruments. The track is peculiar to steamy numbers presented during that phase of Bollywood, with slow and measured use of instruments, chiefly tabla, as an example, in the song Roop Suhana Lagta Hai.

References

External links
 
Film trailer

1996 films
1990s Hindi-language films
Indian action films
1996 action films
Films scored by Anand–Milind
Films directed by Aziz Sejawal